Acria sulawesica is a moth in the family Depressariidae. It was described by Alexandr L. Lvovsky in 2015. It is found on the Indonesian island of Sulawesi.

The wingspan is about 14.5 mm.

Etymology
The species is named for Sulawesi, the type locality.

References

Moths described in 2015
Acria